Victoria blue R is a dye with formula  C29H32N3Cl. It has a blue colour that changes to yellow at low pH values.

Physical data 
Fastness

The dye exerts a high light fastness and washing fastness.

UV/VIS absorption

Victoria Blue R has an absorption peak of around 610nm. 

Chlorides
Triarylmethane dyes
Dimethylamino compounds